John Boyd may refer to:

Politicians

British
Sir John Boyd, 1st Baronet (1718–1800), English sugar merchant
Sir John Boyd, 2nd Baronet (1750–1815), son of the first baronet Boyd
Sir John Boyd (diplomat) (1936–2019), British ambassador and former master of Churchill College, Cambridge
John Boyd (Irish politician) (1789–1862), UK MP for the Irish constituency of Coleraine, 1842–1852 and 1857–1862
Sir John Boyd of Maxpoffle (1826–1895), Lord Provost of Edinburgh 1888 to 1891

American
John Boyd (Wisconsin assemblyman) (1824–1882), English-born American politician in Wisconsin and Kansas
John Boyd (Connecticut politician) (1799–1881), Connecticut state legislator and Secretary of State
John Boyd (Texas politician) (1796–1873), American early settler in Texas and state senator
John Frank Boyd (1853–1945), Nebraska judge and representative
John H. Boyd (politician) (1799–1868), U.S. Representative from New York
John W. Boyd (Tennessee politician) ( 1851–1932), Tennessee assemblyman and attorney
John W. Boyd (Wisconsin politician) (1811–1892), Wisconsin state senator
John Boyd (farmer) (born 1965), American farmer and civil rights leader

Canadian
John Boyd (Canadian politician) (1826–1893), Senator and lieutenant-governor of New Brunswick
Sir John Alexander Boyd (1837–1916), Canadian lawyer and judge

Military figures
 John Boyd (military strategist) (1927–1997), US Air Force colonel and fighter pilot
 John Covert Boyd (1850–1924), Naval surgeon and fraternity founder
 John Parker Boyd (1764–1830), American general
 John McNeil Boyd (1812–1861), Royal Navy captain of HMS Ajax, died in the "Boyd disaster" 1861

Artists
John Boyd (photographer) (1865–1941), Canadian amateur photographer and railway official
John H. Boyd (photographer) (1898–1971), photographer based in Toronto, Ontario
John Boyd (author) (1919–2013), science fiction author
John Boyd (milliner) (1925–2018), fashion designer
John Boyd (sound engineer), American sound engineer
John Boyd (actor) (born 1981), American actor
John Boyd (playwright) (1912–2002), Irish radio producer and playwright

Association football
Jackie Boyd (1926–2007), American soccer player
John Boyd (footballer, born 1881) (1881–1927), Scottish footballer
John Allan Boyd (1929–2019), Scottish footballer (1948 Great Britain Olympic team)
John Boyd (footballer, born 1969), Scottish footballer (Dumbarton FC, St Mirren)

Other
John Morton Boyd (1925–1998), Scottish zoologist and writer
John Boyd (trade unionist) (1917–1989), Scottish trade unionist
John Boyd (Bahamas), free person of color in the 19th century
John Boyd (pastor) (1679–1708), Presbyterian minister in the United States
John Boyd (police officer) (born 1933), HM Chief Inspector of Constabulary for Scotland
John Boyd (bacteriologist) (1891–1981), bacteriologist and Royal Army Medical Corps officer
John St. Clair Boyd, Irish gynaecologist and surgeon

See also
John Boyd Orr (1880–1971), Nobel peace laureate
Boyd (surname)